Arjun Naidu (3 July 1924 – 14 November 2000) was an Indian first-class cricketer who represented Rajasthan. He made his first-class debut for Rajasthan (then Rajputana) in the 1945-46 Ranji Trophy on 2 February 1946.

Naidu died on 14 November 2000 at the age of 76.

Early Years
Mr Arjun Naidu played for multiple teams over the two decades after WW-II, starting at Holkar (Later Madhya Pradesh) but mostly for Rajputana (Later - Rajasthan).
Mr. AR Naidu was a genuine left arm fast bowler, and an opening batsman (1952/1953 Ranji Finals) - he played couple of unofficial Tests for India against MCC team before cricket commenced after the great war. He played most of his cricket under the legendary Col. C.K. Nayudu and later under the patronage of Maharana Bhagwat Singhji of Mewar (Udaipur).

Coaching era 
Naidu later became the director of cricket operations in the state of Mewar. Under his guidance the team did fairly well, eventually with the patronage of Maharana Bhagwat Singhji (who were schoolmates at ' Government High School Ajmer') and later sports board of Rajasthan, and National Institute of Sports. In those times the Rajasthan team did very well in domestic cricket, reaching Ranji Trophy Finals 9 times in the 60's and 70's. Back in the day - many top players played for Rajputana team, the likes of Vinoo Manked, Rajsingh Dungarpur, Hanumant Singh (Banswara),Suryaveer Singh (Banswara),V L Manjrekar,S. P. Gupte &  Salim Durrani.

He was a stalwart of cricket in Rajasthan and under his coaching, many players emerged on the national scene from the state. 
He coached at City Palace Cricket, Udaipur, University Grounds at M B College, B N College & RNT Medical College Ground Udaipur. Later under patronage from Shreeji Arvind Singh ji Mewar he developed the cricket ground at 'Shikarbadi, Udaipur ' .

career highlights- Ranji Trophy Finals 
http://static.espncricinfo.com/db/ARCHIVE/1950S/1952-53/IND_LOCAL/RANJI/HOLKAR_BENG_RJI-FINAL_20-24MAR1953.html
http://static.espncricinfo.com/db/ARCHIVE/1950S/1951-52/IND_LOCAL/RANJI/BOM_HOLKAR_RJI-FINAL_01-05MAR1952.html

References

External links
 

1924 births
2000 deaths
Indian cricketers
Rajasthan cricketers